Balmaghie, from the Scottish Gaelic Baile Mhic Aoidh, is an ecclesiastical and civil parish in the historical county of Kirkcudbrightshire in Dumfries and Galloway, Scotland and was the seat of the McGhee family. It is bordered by the River Dee to the north and east. Threave Castle stands on an island in the river. The River Dee is commonly known as the Black Water of Dee on the northern border, the name changes with the meeting of the Water of Ken to the north west and is then known as Loch Ken along the eastern border.  Balmaghie parish borders Girthon to the west and Tongland and Twynholm to the south. The closest market town is Castle Douglas about 6 miles from Balmaghie Kirk.

The ecclesiastical parish covers the same area as the civil parish and the two are generally not differentiated between.

Balmaghie parish is mainly rural and contains only a handful of small settlements: Laurieston, Bridge of Dee, and Glenlochar as well as number of farms and houses scattered throughout the parish. Farming is the major industry of the area, although there is a large area of commercial forestation operated by the Forestry Commission to the west of Laurieston.  Tourists and locals visit the area to watch wild birds at the RSPB Nature Reserve at Duchrae, the Ken-Dee Marshes. A number of red kite have been re-introduced to the area and can be seen near Laurieston at the Bellymack feeding station.

The 2008 horror film Outpost and its 2012 sequel Outpost:Black Sun were filmed on the Balmaghie estate.

The 2018 mystery novel The Shadow of the Black Earl by Charles E McGarry is set in a fictionalised version of Laurieston Hall and surrounding area.

Balmaghie Kirk 
The ecclesiastical focus of Balmaghie was Balmaghie Kirk, until its closure in 2015. Plans to sell the church for housing conversion were withdrawn following widespread protests and  a petition and it has now been taken over by the Balmaghie Sacred Landscape Trust and the building is now in community use.

The church was built in 1794 and set on a small hillock in Balmaghie overlooking Loch Ken and opposite Crossmichael Kirk on the far bank. Remodelling was carried out by Peddie and Kinnear in 1891–94. The tower was reduced and reroofed in 1893 by William Davidson.

The Balmaghie War Memorial was designed by the sculptor Alexander Carrick in Cullaloe stone and unveiled in 1920.

Estates 
 Balmaghie, house of 1874-80 by John Burnet and John James Burnet, now reduced in size. 
 Hensol or Duchrae, house of 1820s designed by Robert Lugar.  
 Laurieston Hall,  mansion dating from the 17th century with additions in 1893 by architect Sydney Mitchell.
 Livingston House, mid 18th century lairds house.
Netherhall, situated on the river Dee, home of the Ross family. 
 Slogarie, house of 1886 by Peddie and Kinnear, remodelled after a fire by Antony Curtiss Wolffe 1960s.

People 
Archibald the Grim, of Threave Castle
Rear Admiral James Murray Gordon (1782-1850) of Balmaghie House, buried in his private chapel-mausoleum on the estate.
Samuel Rutherford Crockett,  1859- 1914, novelist of Scottish historical fiction. He was born at Duchrae Farm, Balmaghie, on 24 September 1859, the illegitimate son of dairymaid Annie Crocket. Some of his works are set in the surrounding area. He died in Tarascon in France on 16 April 1914. His remains were buried in the family grave in his home kirkyard at Balmaghie. A memorial to him was erected in Laurieston by public subscription in 1932.
John M'Millan (1669-1753) the Cameronian preacher, founder of the Reformed Presbytery. He preached for the first time in Balmaghie Church on 22 December 1700, apparently as ordinary supply, and on 30 April 1701, was elected to the parish. 
Margaret McNaughton 1856-1915 was a Scottish Canadian author and historian. Her account of her husband's experiences travelling across Canada to the Cariboo gold fields was the second non-fiction book published by a woman in British Columbia. Margaret Peebles was born in 1856 to Thomas Peebles and his wife Jane Mackenzie Murie in Balmaghie, she went to British Columbia in 1888, and married Montreal-born Archibald McNaughton.She died in 1915.
 Admiral Sir Nigel Henderson (1909-1993) and his wife Catherine Maitland, lived at Hensol House, former home of the Cuninghame family, and the Marchioness of Ailsa. 
Lt Col John McCrae (1872-1918) wrote  "In Flanders Field" died of pneumonia near the end of the Great War. His parents farmed at Laurieston and emigrated to Canada.
Lieutenant-Colonel Sir Walter Hugh Malcolm Ross, GCVO, OBE, GCStJ (1943-2019) was a member of the Royal Household. Appointed Lord Lieutenant of the Stewartry 2006 and resigned 2018. Lived at Netherhall.

Gallery

See also
 List of listed buildings in Balmaghie, Dumfries and Galloway

References
Citations

Sources

External links

Parish of Balmaghie Home Page
BalmaghieKirk.com

Villages in Dumfries and Galloway
Parishes in Dumfries and Galloway